This list of 2019 motorsport champions is a list of national or international motorsport series with championships decided by the points or positions earned by a driver from multiple races where the season was completed during the 2019 calendar year.

Open wheel racing

Air racing

Dirt oval racing

Drag racing

Drift

eSports

Motorcycle racing

Dirt racing

Rally

Rallycross

Rally raid

Special events

Sports car and GT

Stock car racing

Touring cars

Truck racing

See also
 List of motorsport championships

References

Champions
2019